Daughter of the Wolf is a 2019 Canadian action thriller film directed by David Hackl and written by Nika Agiashvili. The film stars Gina Carano and Richard Dreyfuss.

Plot
Clair Hamilton is a military veteran whose son Charlie has been kidnapped. She brings a bag of money as ransom for Charlie but at the exchange she is double-crossed by the kidnappers, leading to a shootout. Clair shoots two of the kidnappers but one of the men, Larsen, escapes. Clair falls into a frozen lake while chasing him but Larsen pulls her out because he was not planning to kill anyone and did not know about the plans to double-cross her. Clair has a peaceful encounter with a black wolf while recovering, then catches up with Larsen and forces him at gunpoint to take her to the leader of the kidnappers, Father, a man who is angry at her deceased father for closing a mill and leaving money owed to him. As they near the hideout in the snowy forest they are fired upon, but the rifleman is attacked and killed by three wolves. Clair finds the hideout but the kidnappers have moved on to a lodge on the other side of the mountain to await a hand-off to sell off the boy and Larsen reveals that Father killed his father and abducted Larsen and his mother when he was a boy. At the lodge Clair attempts to exchange the money and Larsen for Charlie. Father pulls out a concealed gun and shoots at Charlie but Larsen jumps in front of the bullet and is shot in the back. Clair shoots Father and the other kidnappers, then flees on a snowmobile pursued by the uninjured kidnapper Hobbs whose metal knife stopped the bullet Clair shot at her. Clair crashes her snowmobile and gets into a knife fight with Hobbs but is pushed over the edge of a waterfall and Charlie is captured again. Clair climbs out of the river and is guided into the forest by three wolves. She returns to the lodge, kills the injured kidnapper with a hatchet, and confronts Father, who is inside torturing Larsen with a red hot fire poker while confessing that he killed Larsen's mother after she left him. Charlie returns with Hobbs and Clair throws a knife into her throat. Larsen attacks Father but Father shoots him then turns the gun on Charlie as Clair leaps at Father and pushes him out a window. Clair thanks Larsen before he dies, then she climbs on a snowmobile and exchanges glances with the black wolf as it approaches before she escapes with Charlie. Father rises out of the snow as a pack of wolves descends on him and tears him apart. Three months later, in the spring, Clair and Charlie are hiking a path on the mountain when she sees the black wolf again and smiles.

Cast
Gina Carano as Clair Hamilton
Richard Dreyfuss as Father
Brendan Fehr as Larsen
Sydelle Noel as Hobbs
Anton Gillis-Adelman as Charlie
Chad Riley as Nolan
Brock Morgan as Virgil
Stew McLean as Seth
Joshua Murdoch as Phillip

Production
Filming took place from March 18 to April 13, 2019 at 4205 Gellatly Road, West Kelowna, British Columbia, Canada. There is also a scene near the end featuring Helmcken Falls which is north of Clearwater, BC, in Wells Grey Provincial Park.

Release
The film was released in the United States on 14 June 2019 and in Canada on 2 August 2019. It was later screened in the Center Stage Competition at Taormina Film Fest in Sicily on 30 June 2019.

Response

Critical reception
On Metacritic, the film has a weighted average score of 36 out of 100, based on 6 critics, indicating "generally unfavorable reviews".

Frank Scheck of The Hollywood Reporter called the film "a subpar vehicle for an action star who deserves better" and wondered if Richard Dreyfuss "ever imagined he would be reduced to this sort of B-level material when winning an Academy Award for The Goodbye Girl and working for directors like George Lucas, Steven Spielberg, Paul Mazursky and Barry Levinson."

Courtney Howard of Variety.com called it a "female-led, capably-crafted actioner", writing that "the filmmakers adeptly blur the lines between the heroes and anti-heroes, constructing a dynamic, character-driven portrait of rage and redemption." She concluded, "In an era of the 'Strong Female Character,' Hackl and Agiashvili’s iteration blessedly doesn’t rely on lazy screenwriting shorthand, nor does it pander to feminism with a simple gender-swap in its female-centered feature. These filmmakers are eager to explore the delicate facets of a forceful, fully-formed woman, and they do so with imagery that’s both stunning and subtle."

Bilge Ebiri of The New York Times found that "the lack of depth or dimension becomes fatal" and concluded that "this kidnapping thriller will leave you cold in more ways than one."

The film received three Canadian Screen Award nominations at the 8th Canadian Screen Awards in 2020, for Best TV Movie, Best Supporting Actor in a Television Drama Series or Program (Fehr) and Best Direction in a Television Drama Series or Program (Hackl).

The film earned $7,504,000 at the box office.

References

External links
 
 

2019 films
2019 action thriller films
Canadian action thriller films
English-language Canadian films
2010s English-language films
Films about child abduction
Films about veterans
Films directed by David Hackl
Films set in forests
Films shot in British Columbia
2010s Canadian films